List of Ministers of Finance of Burkina Faso and Upper Volta since the independence of Upper Volta:

Ministers of Finance
Tiémoko Marc Garango, 1966–1976
Mamadou Sanfo, 1976
Léonard Kalmogo, 1976–1980
Edmond Ky, 1980–1982
Inoussa Maïga, 1982
Pascal Sanou, 1982–1983
Justin Damo Baro, 1983–1986
Talata Eugène Dondasse, 1986–1987
Guy Some, 1987–1988
Bintou Sanogoh, 1988–1991, female
Frédéric A. Korsaga, 1991–1992
Roch Marc Christian Kaboré, 1992–1993
Ousmane Ouédraogo, 1993–1994
Zéphirin Diabré, 1994–1996
Kadré Désiré Ouédraogo, 1996–1997
Tertius Zongo, 1997–2000
Paramanga Ernest Yonli, 2000–2002
Jean-Baptiste Compaoré, 2002–2008
Lucien Marie Noel Bembamba, 2008–2014
Jean Sanon, 2014–2016
Rosine Sori-Coulibaly, 2016–2019
Lassané Kaboré, since 2019
Source:

References

See also 
 Economy of Burkina Faso

Government ministers of Burkina Faso

Economy of Burkina Faso